Glen is an unincorporated community in Clay County, West Virginia, United States. Glen has a post office with ZIP code 25088.

References

Unincorporated communities in Clay County, West Virginia
Unincorporated communities in West Virginia